The 1935 All-Pro Team consisted of American football players chosen by various selectors for the All-Pro team of the National Football League (NFL) for the 1935 NFL season. Teams were selected by, among others, the NFL coaches (NFL), the United Press (UP),  the Green Bay Press-Gazette (GB), Collyer's Eye (CE), and the Chicago Daily News (CDN).

Players displayed in bold were consensus first-team selections. The following six players were selected to the first team by all five selectors: Detroit Lions quarterback Dutch Clark; New York Giants halfback Ed Danowski; Chicago Cardinals end Bill Smith; Chicago Bears end Bill Karr; New York Giants tackle Bill Morgan; and New York Giants center Mel Hein.

Team

References

All-Pro Teams
1935 National Football League season